Bear Creek is a  long 4th order tributary to the Deep River in Moore and Randolph Counties, North Carolina.

Course
Bear Creek rises in a pond in Seagrove, North Carolina in Randolph County and then flows southeast into Moore County and then turns northeast at Robbins, North Carolina to join the Deep River about 1 mile west of High Falls, North Carolina.

Watershed
Bear Creek drains  of area, receives about 47.8 in/year of precipitation, and has a wetness index of 405.73 and is about 58% forested.

See also
List of rivers of North Carolina

References

Rivers of North Carolina
Rivers of Moore County, North Carolina
Rivers of Randolph County, North Carolina